Atatürk Museum is a historic house museum dedicated to the life of Mustafa Kemal Atatürk, the first president of the Republic of Turkey. It is located in the district of Şişli, on the European side of Istanbul, Turkey.

It is located in a three-storey house built in 1908. Mustafa Kemal rented the house after returning from the Syrian Front and lived there with his mother Zübeyde, sister Makbule and adopted son Abdurrahim. He lived there until May 16, 1919, the day he sailed on the ship Bandırma to Samsun, on his way to the headquarters of the Ninth Army Troops Inspectorate in Erzurum. The house was purchased in 1928 by the Municipality of Istanbul and some of Atatürk's personal belongings were stored there. The house was converted to a museum and opened to visitors on June 15, 1942, as Atatürk Revolution Museum.

The museum houses personal belongings of Atatürk like clothes and collections, other than historical documents, photographs and paintings of his lifetime.

See also
Atatürk Museums in Turkey

References 

 Atatürk Museum  at Istanbul Metropolitan Municipality website

External links

 Images of Atatürk Museum

Museums in Istanbul
Sisli
Museums established in 1942
Historic house museums in Turkey
Şişli
1942 establishments in Turkey
Biographical museums in Turkey